The first season of the American television comedy The Office premiered in the United States on NBC on March 24, 2005, concluded on April 26, 2005, and consists of six episodes.  The Office is an American adaptation of the British TV series of the same name, and is presented in a mockumentary format, portraying the daily lives of office employees in the Scranton, Pennsylvania branch of the fictitious Dunder Mifflin Paper Company. The season stars Steve Carell, Rainn Wilson, John Krasinski, Jenna Fischer, and B. J. Novak.

This season introduced the main characters, and established the general plot, which revolves around Michael Scott (Carell), regional manager of the Scranton branch office, trying to convince the filmmakers of the documentary that he presides over a happy, well-running office. Meanwhile, sales rep Jim Halpert (Krasinski) finds methods to undermine his cube-mate, Dwight Schrute (Wilson); receptionist Pam Beesly (Fischer) tries to deal with Michael's insensitivities and flubs; and temporary employee Ryan Howard (Novak) is acting mostly as an observer of the insanity around him.

Season one of The Office aired on Tuesdays in the United States at 9:30 p.m. The season debuted to high numbers, and garnered moderately positive reviews from critics aside from the pilot which received mixed reviews. While some enjoyed the pilot, others opined that it was a mere copy of the original British version. Universal Studios Home Entertainment released season one in a single DVD on August 16, 2005. The DVD contained all six episodes, along with commentaries from creators, writers, actors, and directors on most of the episodes, as well as deleted scenes from all of the episodes.

Production
The first season of the show was produced by Reveille Productions and Deedle-Dee Productions, both in association with NBC Universal Television Studios.  The show is based upon the British series created by Ricky Gervais and Stephen Merchant, who are executive producers on the show, and it is produced by Greg Daniels, also an executive producer, along with consulting producers Larry Wilmore and Lester Lewis.  The show's writers include Daniels, Gervais, Merchant, and Michael Schur, while Mindy Kaling, Paul Lieberstein, and B. J. Novak double as writers as well as actors in the show, and between them, wrote three episodes on the season. For this season, Schur was a co-producer, Kaling was a staff writer, Lieberstein was a consulting producer, and Novak was an executive story editor. The first episode, "Pilot", was written by Daniels, but the majority of the episode was adapted from "Episode One" of the British series, with many scenes being transferred almost verbatim.

Season one featured episodes directed by five different directors.  The Office features both a "team of directors" as well as several directors who are freelanced.  Ken Kwapis directed the first two episodes, "Pilot" and "Diversity Day", and would go on to direct another eleven episodes in total, including the final episode of the series.  Ken Whittingham, who directed "Health Care", would go on to direct another eight episodes in total.  Daniels both produced and directed the episode "Basketball".  The Office was almost entirely filmed in an actual office building in Los Angeles, California for its first season.  Aside from Los Angeles, the city of Scranton, Pennsylvania, where the show is set, was also used for shots for the opening theme.

Cast

Many characters portrayed by The Office cast are based on the British version of the show.  While these characters normally have the same attitude and perceptions as their British counterparts, the roles have been redesigned to better fit the American show.  The show is known for its generally large cast size, many of whom are known particularly for their improvisational work.

Main
 Steve Carell as Michael Scott, regional manager of the Dunder Mifflin Scranton Branch.  Loosely based on David Brent, Gervais' character in the British version, Scott is a dim-witted and lonely man, who attempts to win friends as the office comedian, usually making himself look bad in the process. 
 Rainn Wilson as Dwight Schrute, who, based upon Gareth Keenan, is the assistant to the regional manager, although the character frequently intentionally omits the "to the" in his title. 
 John Krasinski as Jim Halpert, a sales representative and prankster, who is based upon Tim Canterbury, and has a crush on Pam Beesly, the receptionist. 
 Jenna Fischer as Pam Beesly, a receptionist based on Dawn Tinsley, is shy, but is often a cohort with Jim in his pranks on Dwight.
 B. J. Novak as Ryan Howard, who is a temporary worker.

Recurring
 Melora Hardin as Jan Levinson-Gould, vice president of regional sales.
 David Denman as Roy Anderson, a warehouse worker and Pam's fiancé.
 Leslie David Baker as Stanley Hudson, a grumpy salesman.
 Brian Baumgartner as Kevin Malone, a dim-witted accountant.
 Creed Bratton as Creed Bratton, the office's strange quality assurance officer.
 Kate Flannery as Meredith Palmer, the promiscuous supplier relations rep.
 Mindy Kaling as Kelly Kapoor, the pop-culture obsessed customer service representative.
 Angela Kinsey as Angela Martin, a judgemental accountant, who also serves as Dwight's love interest.
 Paul Lieberstein as Toby Flenderson, the sad-eyed human resources representative.
 Oscar Nunez as Oscar Martinez, an intelligent accountant.
 Craig Robinson as Darryl Philbin, the warehouse supervisor.
 Phyllis Smith as Phyllis Lapin, a motherly saleswoman.
 Devon Abner as Devon White, a supplier relations representative.

Notable guests
 Toby Huss as the voice of Todd Packer, a rude and offensive traveling salesman, and Michael's best friend (David Koechner would play the character in later seasons).
 Larry Wilmore as Mr. Brown, a consultant who arrives to teach the office about tolerance and diversity.
 Patrice O’Neal as Lonny Collins, a warehouse worker.
 Amy Adams as Katy Moore, a handbag saleswoman.

Broadcast and reception

Ratings
 
The first episode of The Office scored well in ratings, gaining over eleven million viewers, as well as ranking third in its timeslot on the night of its airing.  But the episode aired on a Thursday evening, and between the change from the first episode and the second episode, The Office moved to its regular time slot on Tuesday evenings. The Office tumbled in the ratings, averaging under 6.0 million viewers, just over half that of the previous episode.  The first-season finale "Hot Girl" received one of the lowest ratings in the show's history, earning just a 2.2 rating with a 10 share. After the lackluster reception of the episode, many critics erroneously predicted that "Hot Girl" would also serve as the de facto series finale. The Office averaged 5.4 million viewers for its entire season, ranking it #102 for the 2004–2005 U.S. television season.

Reviews

The series premiere, "Pilot", received largely mixed reviews from critics. After the first episodes, critics thought The Office would be another failed remake of a British comedy, much like how the American version of Coupling was in relation to the original British series. The Deseret Morning News believed The Office was a failed remake, and said "Maybe, after The Office dies a quick death on NBC, the network will decide that trying to Americanize British TV comedies isn't such a great idea." The New York Daily News said the show was "neither daring nor funny", adding that "NBC's version is so diluted there's little left but muddy water". The Los Angeles Times complained that Steve Carell, who portrays Scott and also appeared in the movie Anchorman: The Legend of Ron Burgundy, was "too cartoon" and said: "Lost in translation is the sadness behind the characters."

Despite these criticisms, the remainder of the season earned mostly positive reviews among critics. The season scored 62 out of 100 on Metacritic (a website that assigns a weighted average score for media), which translates to "generally favorable reviews." Time magazine wrote that "It's ironic that NBC's most original sitcom in years is a remake, but who cares? The Office is a daring, unflinching take on very American workplace tensions." Boston.com felt that the first season of The Office was good, and the differences between the characters of the American and the original series added to the popularity of the series. Rob Owen of the Pittsburgh Post-Gazette felt that The Office succeeded in its first season, and that although NBC had failed in the past with television shows such as Coupling, it had found achievement with The Office. Entertainment Weekly awarded the season a "B+" and wrote that The Office "is clever and insular, capturing all the drudgery, awkwardness, and rivalry of cubicle living" and that the last five episodes help to illustrate that the series has "crossed the pond handily."

In addition, "Diversity Day," the season's second episode, has been regarded as one of the best episodes of the entire show. TV Guide named it the nineteenth greatest episode of any television show in 2009. Rolling Stone magazine named the scene wherein Michael shows the office his diversity video the third greatest moment from The Office.

Accolades
In its first year, The Office was nominated for several awards, including three Writers Guild of America Award nods. These included nominations for Best Comedy Series and Best New Series. In addition, for his work on "Diversity Day," B. J. Novak was nominated for a Writers Guild of America Award for Best Screenplay – Episodic Comedy.

Episodes

DVD release

References

External links
 
 

2005 American television seasons